"But Not for Me" is a popular song originally written by George Gershwin and Ira Gershwin for the musical Girl Crazy (1930).

Ella Fitzgerald's 1959 version of "But Not for Me," which appeared on Ella Fitzgerald Sings the George and Ira Gershwin Songbook, won the 1960 Grammy Award for Best Female Vocal Performance.

Singer Ketty Lester remade "But Not for Me" with a gospel arrangement. The song reached No. 10 on the US Adult Contemporary chart, No. 41 on the Billboard Top 40, and No. 45 in the UK in 1962.

Other recordings
 Harry James with Helen Forrest – recorded for Columbia on December 30, 1941 and reached No. 12 in the Billboard charts in 1942.
 Bing Crosby – recorded both in 1942 and 1954 for his radio show. It was included in the box set The Bing Crosby CBS Radio Recordings (1954–56) issued by Mosaic in 2009.
 Judy Garland – for the 1943 film Girl Crazy.
 Miles Davis – Bags' Groove (1954).
Chet Baker – Chet Baker Sings (1954).
 Doris Day on Day by Day (1956).
  Buddy De Franco on Mr. Clarinet (1956).
 Modern Jazz Quartet – Django (1956).
 Kenny Burrell – Introducing Kenny Burrell (1956).
 Red Garland – Red Garland's Piano (1956).
 Polly Bergen – on The Polly Bergen Show (1957).
 Ahmad Jamal – At the Pershing: But Not for Me (1958).
 Ella Fitzgerald – Ella Fitzgerald Sings the George and Ira Gershwin Songbook (1959).
 John Coltrane – My Favorite Things (1961).
 Sam Cooke – My Kind of Blues (1961).
 Dexter Gordon – Take the A Train (1967).
 Linda Ronstadt – For Sentimental Reasons (Linda Ronstadt album) (1986).
Harry Connick Jr. – for the 1989 film and subsequent soundtrack When Harry Met Sally.
 Elton John – in 1993 for the 1994 film Four Weddings and a Funeral.
 Olivier Caillard and Hélène Bohy – C'est pas pour moi (French version) in Les P'tits Loups du Jazz (1993).
 James Moody with Kenny Barron – Moody 48 (2008).
Frank Sinatra - Trilogy (Album 1 The Past) 1979
 Barry Manilow - Night Songs (Barry Manilow album) (2014)
 Rod Stewart - Stardust - The great american Songbook III (2004)
 Diana Krall - Love Is Here to Stay (album) (2018). Krall talks about and performs the song while interviewed by Elton John on Spectacle: Elvis Costello with...
 Esperanza Spalding and Fred Hersch - Alive at the Village Vanguard (2023)

See also
 List of 1930s jazz standards

References 

1930 songs
1930s jazz standards
Ella Fitzgerald songs
Ketty Lester songs
Pop standards
Songs from Girl Crazy
Songs with lyrics by Ira Gershwin
Songs with music by George Gershwin
Grammy Award for Best Female Pop Vocal Performance